Parliamentary elections were held in Iceland in 1844. They were the first elections in the country's history.

Electoral system
The Althing was composed of 26 members, twenty of which were elected and six of which were appointed by the monarch. The twenty members were elected in single-member constituencies by plurality voting. Each voter had two votes, with the runner-up becoming the MP's deputy. Voting was restricted to male property owners over the age of 25.

Results

Elected members

Appointed members

References

1844 elections in Europe
1844 in Iceland
Parliamentary elections in Iceland